Adrian Diaconu (born 9 June 1978) is a Romanian former professional boxer who competed from 2001 to 2011, and held the WBC light-heavyweight title from 2008 to 2009. As an amateur he won a silver medal in the middleweight division at the 1999 World Championships and bronze in the light-middleweight division at the 1997 World Championships. Diaconu was born in Ploieşti, Romania, but fought out of Montreal, Quebec, Canada for almost his entire professional career.

Amateur career
Diaconu represented Romania at the 2000 Olympics in the middleweight division.

Olympic results:
Defeated Abdelhani Kenzi (Algeria) 19-9
Defeated Jitender Kumar (India) 12-3
Lost to Jorge Gutiérrez (Cuba) KO 1

Professional career
Following the Olympics, Diaconu made his professional debut in 2001 and competed exclusively as a light-heavyweight. He went on to claim his first regional championship in June 2005, winning the Canadian title with a fifth-round knockout of Conal MacPhee. In December 2005, Diaconu won the WBC International title after knocking out Darrin Humphrey. This was followed up with a knockout against Max Heyman to win the vacant WBA–NABA and TAB titles. Diaconu vacated his Canadian title to face Rico Hoye in an eliminator bout for the WBC world title. He was successful, dominating Hoye until a stoppage in the third round. With the win, Diaconu became the mandatory challenger for then-WBC world champion Chad Dawson.

In October 2007, world cruiserweight champion David Haye described Diaconu as "the future of the light-heavyweight division."

On 19 April 2008, Diaconu won the vacant WBC interim title with a twelve-round unanimous decision over Chris Henry in Romania; the interim title being at stake to allow full titleholder Chad Dawson to make an optional defense after a previous injury-produced delay to the mandated bout. In July 2008, Diaconu was elevated to full champion status after Dawson vacated the title to avoid having to make the mandatory defense.

Diaconu suffered his first career defeat and lost the WBC world title to Jean Pascal on 19 June 2009, and would go on to lose a rematch on 11 December 2009. Diaconu's final professional fight took place on 21 May 2011 against former champion Chad Dawson, who defeated Diaconu by a unanimous decision after twelve rounds. A year later, Diaconu announced his retirement from boxing, stating that he felt a lack of support from his promoters, Interbox, to organize significant fights for him.

Professional boxing record

References

External links

World boxing champions
World light-heavyweight boxing champions
World Boxing Council champions
Light-heavyweight boxers
Romanian expatriates in Canada
Sportspeople from Ploiești
1978 births
Boxers at the 2000 Summer Olympics
Olympic boxers of Romania
Living people
Romanian male boxers
AIBA World Boxing Championships medalists
Light-middleweight boxers
Middleweight boxers